Ballistic, in comics, may refer to:

 Ballistic (Image Comics), a comic book character appearing in Marc Silvestri's series Cyberforce
 Ballistic (DC Comics), a DC Comics superhero

See also
Ballistic (disambiguation)